Adolph Caesar (December 5, 1933 – March 6, 1986) was an American actor, theatre director, playwright, dancer, and choreographer.

Known for his signature deep voice, Caesar was a staple of Off-Broadway as a member of the Negro Ensemble Company, and as a voiceover artist for numerous film trailers. He earned widespread acclaim for his performance as Sgt. Vernon Waters in Charles Fuller's Pulitzer Prize-winning A Soldier's Play, a role he reprised in the 1984 film adaptation A Soldier's Story, for which he was nominated for an Academy Award and Golden Globe Award won an NAACP Image Award for Outstanding Actor in a Motion Picture.

Early life and education
Caesar was born Harlem, New York City in 1933 as the youngest of three sons born to a Dominican mother and a black indigenous father. At age 12, he contracted laryngitis which led to his notably deep voice.

After graduating from George Washington High School in 1952, Caesar enlisted in the United States Navy during the Korean War era, serving as a hospital corpsman for five years, achieving the rank of chief petty officer. Upon his discharge from the service, he decided to break into the theater and went on to study drama at New York University, graduating in 1962.

Career

Early career
Caesar made his film debut in 1969 in Che!, playing Cuban revolutionary Juan Almeida Bosque. A year later, Caesar became an announcer for and then joined the Negro Ensemble Company in 1970 for productions such as The River Niger, Square Root of the Soul, and The Brownsville Raid. Caesar also later worked with the Minnesota Theater Company, Inner City Repertory Company, and the American Shakespeare Theatre. He had a stint on the soap operas Guiding Light and General Hospital in 1964 and 1969, respectively.

Thanks to his voice, Caesar found frequent work as a voice-over artist for television and radio commercials, including theatrical previews and radio commercials for many blaxploitation films such as Cleopatra Jones, Superfly, Truck Turner and The Spook Who Sat by the Door. For many years, he was the voice of the United Negro College Fund's publicity campaign, reciting the iconic slogan "...because a mind is a terrible thing to waste."

Later in his career, Caesar also lent his voice to the animated series Silverhawks, in which he voiced Hotwing, a magician and skilled illusionist.

In 1980, Caesar appeared in the infamous Bruceploitation mockumentary Fist of Fear, Touch of Death, playing himself as a fictional television news reporter investigating the death of Bruce Lee.

A Soldier's Play
Caesar’s most iconic work, however started with his role as Army Sergeant. Vernon C. Waters in Charles Fuller's Pulitzer Prize-winning stage drama, A Soldier's Play, in which Caesar won Drama Desk Award for Outstanding Featured Actor in a Play and an Obie Award for Outstanding Off-Broadway Achievement. A Soldier’s Play is set in Louisiana during World War II, just before the U.S. military was desegregated. Waters is a self-loathing Black man who strives for equality and recognition for African-Americans while displaying a deep, borderline sadistic contempt for "stereotypically black" and Southern-born soldiers, and whose eventual murder by one of his own men kickstarts the story's plot.

In a 1985 interview with the Los Angeles Times, Caesar stated he drew on his own experiences in crafting the character of Waters. "I’d studied Shakespeare to death. I knew more about Shakespeare than Shakespeare knew about himself. After I did one season at a Shakespearean repertory company, a director said to me, ‘You have a marvelous voice. You know the king’s English well. You speak iambic pentameter. My suggestion is that you go to New York and get a good colored role.' Waters has tried his best, but no matter what you do, they still hate you.“ Caesar subsequently coined the character's signature phrase, "They still hate you".

Caesar subsequently reprised his role as Waters in Norman Jewison's 1984 film adaptation of Fuller's play, retitled A Soldier's Story. His performance was similarly acclaimed and earned him numerous accolades, including Academy Award and Golden Globe Award nominations for Best Supporting Actor, and an NAACP Image Award for Outstanding Actor in a Motion Picture. He also won the Los Angeles Film Critics Association Award for Best Supporting Actor.

Later career
On the basis of his Soldier's Story success, Caesar was cast in Steven Spielberg's The Color Purple as Old Mister Johnson, the father of Danny Glover's character. He also appeared on an episode of The Twilight Zone and an ABC Afterschool Special. Caesar's last completed film was Club Paradise, released posthumously.

Personal life
Caesar had three children with his wife Diane, whom he was married to until his death.

Death
Caesar was working on the Los Angeles set of the 1986 film Tough Guys (with Burt Lancaster and Kirk Douglas) when he suffered a heart attack and died a short time later. His role was recast with Eli Wallach. He was interred in the Ferncliff Cemetery in Hartsdale, New York.

Works

Film

Television

Theatre (partial)

Awards and honors

References

External links

Adolph Caesar's Entry at the Lortel Archives
Adolph Caesar's Entry at the Grindhouse Database
Los Angeles Times

1933 births
1986 deaths
African Americans in the Korean War
African-American male actors
African-American United States Navy personnel
Afro-Latino culture in the United States
American male film actors
American male stage actors
American male television actors
American male voice actors
American people of Dominica descent
Burials at Ferncliff Cemetery
Drama Desk Award winners
George Washington Educational Campus alumni
People from Harlem
Male actors from New York City
Military personnel from New York City
United States Navy chiefs
United States Navy corpsmen
20th-century American male actors